Carl Nilsson (9 May 1897 – 29 May 1970) was a Swedish wrestler. He competed in the freestyle middleweight event at the 1924 Summer Olympics in Paris, France.

References

External links
 

1897 births
1970 deaths
Olympic wrestlers of Sweden
Wrestlers at the 1924 Summer Olympics
Swedish male sport wrestlers
People from Scania